Girl on the Run may refer to:
 Girl on the Run (1958 film), an American private detective film
 Girl on the Run (1953 film), an American ultra-low budget independent film
 Girl on the Run (album), a 1999 album by Victoria Silvstedt

See also
 Girls on the Run, an American non-profit organization
 Girls on the Run (poem), a poem by John Ashbery